This is a list of I. M. Pei projects.  I. M. Pei (19172019) was a Chinese-American architect known for his creative use of modernist architecture in combination with natural elements and open spaces. During his six decades of architectural work, he designed some of the world's most recognizable buildings in countries around the world.

List of I. M. Pei projects

See also 

 Pei Cobb Freed & Partners

References 

I. M. Pei buildings
Pei, I. M.